Erik Call, born on May 12, 1981 in La Crosse, Wisconsin, is an American cinematographer, writer, photographer and actor.

Erik Call is of Norwegian descent, and wrote the script for the TV series Møkkakaffe which aired on the Norwegian broadcasting service NRK in November and December 2013. The Norwegian title translates roughly as Bad coffee. The series consists of seven episodes, and evolves around two men who are hospitalized after a severe car accident. Their families are summoned to the hospital, and fail to understand how the two men found themselves in the same car to begin with. The dialogue is conducted partly in sign language (Norwegian sign language, as opposed to American sign language), partly in Norwegian.

In 2016, the NRK showed a documentary programme called Eriks arv (English: "Erik's inheritance"), in which Call's journey back to his Norwegian forefather's small farm in Norway is documented.

Filmography

Writer 
 2013: Møkkakaffe (TV series)
 2013: Baby I Try for You (Tim Sweeney) (short
 2012: It's my role! (short)
 2011: Raw (short)
 2009: Glee (video short)
 2004: Rangeland Romances (short)

Editor 
 2013: California School for the Deaf (documentary)
 2013: Baby I Try for You (Tim Sweeney) (short)
 2011: Raw (short)
 2009: Glee (video short)

References 

American writers
American cinematographers
American people of Norwegian descent
Living people
1981 births
People from La Crosse, Wisconsin
Filmmakers from Wisconsin